Zetterberg is a surname. Notable people with the surname include:

Christer Zetterberg (1941–2012), Swedish businessman
Erik Zetterberg (born 1997), Swedish footballer
Hanna Zetterberg (born 1973), Swedish politician
Henrik Zetterberg (born 1980), Swedish ice hockey player
Herman Zetterberg (1904–1963), Swedish jurist and politician
Margaretha Zetterberg (1733–1803), Swedish woman
Pär Zetterberg (born 1970), Swedish footballer
Stephen Zetterberg (1916–2009), American attorney
Torbjörn Zetterberg (born 1976), Swedish jazz musician and composer